Farmer Township may refer to:

Farmer Township, Rice County, Kansas
Farmer Township, Defiance County, Ohio

See also
Farmers Township, Fulton County, Illinois
Farmers Creek Township, Jackson County, Iowa